The Estonian Newspaper Association is an umbrella organisation representing common interests of newspapers published in Estonia. As of July 28, 2007, it represents 41 publications.

The association was established in 1990 and has been a member of World Association of Newspapers since 1991.

Estonian Press Council
In 2002 the association established the Estonian Press Council (Avaliku Sõna Nõukogu), with the purpose of the supervision of the Estonian press. It is a self-regulating body of the Estonian press. It provides a possibility to settle readers' complaints out of court, free of charge.

Press Friend Award 
Since 1994, the association has given out a yearly Press Friend award and an accompanying Press Enemy award. The Press Friend award comes with a stylised sculpture of a megaphone; there is no accompanying sculpture for the Press Enemy award.

References

External links 
 

1990 establishments in Estonia
Newspaper associations